Everybody Loves Sunshine (released in the United States as B.U.S.T.E.D.), is a 1999 British independent film written and directed by Andrew Goth and starring Rachel Shelley, David Bowie and Goldie.

Plot
In the Pepperhill Estate of Manchester, an ongoing battle rages between Triad gangs and street gangs. Gang leaders Ray (Andrew Goth) and Terry (Goldie), who are cousins and lifelong friends, always trusting and relying on each other, have been in prison.  Ray doesn't want to be a gangster anymore, having also fallen for Clare (Rachel Shelley). But Terry, driven by an obsession beyond friendship, is determined to make sure that Ray never leaves the gang. During their time in prison, the Triads have grown stronger and more daring, eventually killing a member of Terry and Ray's gang. Revenge is called for and the gang turns to them for direction. Bernie (David Bowie) is the aging gangster who struggles to keep the peace.

Critical reception
Film Threat magazine, in its review, described the film as a "very British tale of vengeance and mayhem worth sitting through – though just barely," crediting the film's "arresting visual presentation." The review notes that Bowie's an "odd presence throughout" and "he often seems to be wandering in from a movie on another channel."

See also
 Gangster No. 1

References

External links
 

1999 films
1999 crime thriller films
Triad films
Hood films
British crime thriller films
1990s English-language films
1990s British films
1990s Hong Kong films